The first season of the animated television series Kappa Mikey, created by Larry Schwarz, originally aired on the Nicktoons Network channel in the United States.

Plot
The series focuses on a self-centered, cocky adolescent American actor named Mikey who wins a starring role in the popular Japanese television series LilyMu, centering on a team of crime-fighters with personalities based around typical anime characters. He becomes acquainted with his co-stars, including Gonard, a tall, husky, sweet, rather dimwitted young man who portrays the primary antagonist of the LilyMu series, Lily, the spoiled, heartless portrayer of the otherwise ingenuous and sweet damsel-in-distress of LilyMu who contempts Mikey for having overtaken her limelight, Mitsuki, a sweet-natured actress infatuated with Mikey who plays a much tougher character in the series than in reality, and Guano, a small, fuzzy purple creature with many insecurities, responsibilities, strange habits and tendencies. The program in which the actors are featured is run by a tyrannical, strict, and loud boss named Ozu, noted for his sour demeanor yet mentoring guide and constant infuriation with Mikey, aided by "Yes-Man," his dedicated and trustworthy assistant who loyally upholds him and agrees with any decision that he makes. The series centers on the actors' daily lives aside from filming the television program and the predicaments in which they may entangle themselves at the hands of their own cockiness, incompetence, or celebrity status, and episodes usually feature sub-plots following the lives of whichever characters are not being primarily featured in that particular episode. The series relies heavily on gags and other things for comedy.

Cast

Main
Michael Sinterniklaas as Mikey Simon
Sean Schemmel as Gonard
Gary Mack as Guano
Kether Donohue as Lily
Carrie Keranen as Mitsuki
Stephen Moverly as Ozu
Jesse Adams as Yes Man

Episodes 
Note: All episodes of the series were directed by Sergei Aniskov.

2006 American television seasons
2007 American television seasons
Kappa Mikey